Gylmar dos Santos Neves (22 August 1930 – 25 August 2013), known simply as Gilmar, was a Brazilian footballer who played goalkeeper for Corinthians and Santos and was a member of the Brazil national team in three World Cups. He was elected the best Brazilian goalkeeper of the 20th century and one of the best in the world by the IFFHS. He is remembered for his sober style on the pitch and his peaceful personality.

Alex Bellos says in his book Futebol: The Brazilian Way of Life that Gilmar is named after his parents, Gilberto and Maria. Gilmar was the starting goalkeeper for Pelé's Santos and Brazilian national teams of the 1960s. In 1998, he was awarded the FIFA Order of Merit.

Club career 
Gilmar was born in Santos, São Paulo, and started his career playing for hometown side Jabaquara. In 1951 he joined Corinthians, winning three Campeonato Paulista titles with the club in 1951, 1952 and 1954.

In 1961, Gilmar signed for Santos, being a part of the team who was known as Os Santásticos. An immediate starter, he won five Campeonato Paulista (1962, 1964, 1965, 1967, 1968), five Taça Brasil (1961, 1962, 1963, 1964, 1965), two Copa Libertadores (1962 and 1963) and two Intercontinental Cups (1962 against Eusébio's Benfica and 1963 against Milan).

International career 

With the Brazil national team, Gilmar played 94 times, allowing only 95 goals. He was selected to the national squad for three straight World Cups, between 1958 and 1966. He was part of the starting team in the first two World Cups Brazil won, in 1958 and 1962, and is the only goalkeeper to win two consecutive World Cups in the starting position.

Style of play
Regarded by pundits as one of the greatest Brazilian goalkeepers of all time, Gilmar was an agile shot-stopper, who possessed excellent reflexes, and who was also known for his composure under pressure, as well as his ability to inspire a sense of calm and confidence in his defenders.

Death
Gilmar died of a stroke on 25 August 2013, three days after his 83rd birthday.

Honours
Corinthians
Campeonato Paulista: 1951, 1952, 1954
Torneio Rio–São Paulo: 1953, 1954

Santos
Campeonato Brasileiro Série A: 1962, 1963, 1964, 1965, 1968
Campeonato Paulista: 1962, 1964, 1965, 1967, 1968
Torneio Rio–São Paulo: 1963, 1964, 1966
Copa Libertadores: 1962, 1963
Intercontinental Cup: 1962, 1963

Brazil
FIFA World Cup: 1958, 1962
Taça do Atlântico: 1956, 1960

References

External links

 
 Corinthians All Time Best XI Placar Magazine
 
 Profile at goalkeepersaredifferent.com

1930 births
2013 deaths
Sportspeople from Santos, São Paulo
Brazilian footballers
1958 FIFA World Cup players
1962 FIFA World Cup players
1966 FIFA World Cup players
Brazil international footballers
Copa Libertadores-winning players
FIFA World Cup-winning players
Association football goalkeepers
Santos FC players
Sport Club Corinthians Paulista players